Borac may refer to:

 FK Borac Banja Luka, a football club from Banja Luka, Bosnia and Herzegovina
 RK Borac Banja Luka, an affiliated team handball club
 OK Borac, an affiliated volleyball club
 FK Borac Čačak, a football club from Čačak, Serbia
 KK Borac Čačak, a basketball club from Čačak, Serbia
 Borac Laraki, a Moroccan sportscar made by Laraki
 Borač (disambiguation)
 Borac (film), a 2001 Bosnian television drama